Sant Feliu (St Felix) is a Romanesque and Gothic-style, Roman Catholic church located in the city of Xàtiva, Valencia, Spain. 

The church was erected in 1265, after the capture of the town by King Jaume I of Aragon. It is located near Castell, near the lookout of Bellveret. It is sited on the site of an ancient cathedral.

References 

Roman Catholic churches in Xàtiva
Xàtiva
Xàtiva
Xàtiva